The Airbus A320neo family is a development of the A320 family of narrow-body airliners produced by Airbus.

The A320neo family (neo being Greek for "new", as well as an initialism for "new engine option") is based on the previous A319, A320 and A321 (enhanced variant), which was then renamed A320ceo, for "current engine option".

Re-engined with CFM LEAP or Pratt & Whitney GTF engines and fitted with sharklets as standard, it is 15% to 20% more fuel efficient than prior models, retroactively renamed the A320ceo (current engine option).

It was launched on 1 December 2010, made its first flight on 25 September 2014 and was introduced by Lufthansa on 25 January 2016.

By 2019, the A320neo had a 60% market share against the competing Boeing 737 MAX.
, a total of 8,689 A320neo family aircraft had been ordered by more than 130 customers, of which 2,608 aircraft had been delivered. The global A320neo fleet had completed more than 5.51 million flights over 11 million block hours with one hull loss being an airport-safety related or non-aeronautical accident.

Development

In 2006 Airbus started the A320 Enhanced (A320E) programme as a series of improvements targeting a 4–5% efficiency gain with large winglets (2%), aerodynamic refinements (1%), weight savings and a new aircraft cabin.
At the time Airbus' Sales Chief John Leahy said "Who's going to roll over a fleet to a new generation aircraft for 5% better than an A320 today? Especially if another 10% improvement might be coming in the second half of the next decade based on new engine technology".

Airbus launched the sharklet blended wingtip device during the November 2009 Dubai Airshow.

New Engine Option

Compared to the re-engine improvement of 15%, an all-new single-aisle would have brought only 3% more gain while high volume manufacturing in carbon fibre could be much more expensive.

Airbus planned to offer two engine choices, the CFM International LEAP-1A and the Pratt & Whitney GTF (PW1100G), with 20% lower maintenance cost than current A320 engines.
The new engines burn 16% less fuel, though the actual gain is slightly less as 1–2% is typically lost when installed on an existing aircraft.

At the February 2010 Singapore Air Show, Airbus said its decision to launch was scheduled for the July 2010 Farnborough Air Show. On 1 December 2010, Airbus launched the A320neo "New Engine Option" with  more range or  more payload, and planned to deliver 4,000 over 15 years.
Development costs were predicted to be "slightly more than €1 billion [$1.3 billion]". The neo list price would be $6 million more than the ceo, including $3.5 million for airframe modifications and around $0.9 million for the sharklets. The A320neo was slated for service entry in spring 2016, the A321neo six months later and the A319neo six months after that.

The 2010 order for 40 Bombardier CS300s (now known as Airbus A220-300) and 40 options from Republic Airways Holdings – then owner of exclusive A319/320 operator Frontier Airlines – pushed Airbus into the re-engine. Airbus COO-customers John Leahy decided against ignoring the CSeries and allowing it to grow, as Boeing had previously done with Airbus, and instead aggressively competed against Bombardier Aerospace.

Introduction was then advanced to October 2015. Airbus claims a 15% fuel saving and "over 95 percent airframe commonality with the current A320".
Its commonality helped to reduce delays associated with large changes.
In March 2013, airlines' choices between the two engines were almost equal.

The new "Space-Flex" optional cabin configuration increases space-efficiency with a new rear galley configuration and a "Smart-Lav" modular lavatory design  allowing an in-flight change of two lavatories into one accessible toilet.
The rearranged cabin allows up to 20 more passengers for the A321neo without "putting more sardines in the can" with the larger "Cabin-Flex" modified exits described below.
Total fuel consumption per seat is reduced by over 20%, while the rearranged cabin allows up to nine more passengers for the A320neo.

The first Airbus A320neo rolled out of the Toulouse factory on 1 July 2014 and first flight was scheduled for September 2014.

Flight testing

The first flight of the neo occurred on 25 September 2014. Its Pratt & Whitney PW1100G-JM geared turbofan ('GTF') engine was certified by the Federal Aviation Administration (FAA) on 19 December 2014.
After 36 months, the A320neo and A321neo had flown around 4,000 hours for certification of the two powerplant versions.
This is about three-quarters of the certification effort of a new design.

Of these 4,000 hours flown, 2,250 were with PW GTFs and 1,770 with CFM LEAPs. The flight test programme was to conclude in 2018 with the completion of A319neo testing. The changes impact flying qualities, performance and system integration; they entailed retuning the fly-by-wire controls and meeting type certification requirements which have evolved since 1988, and helped decrease the minimum V speeds. The neo is 1.8t heavier than the ceo, but take-off and landing performance is the same with a modified rotation law, adjusted wing flap and wing slat angles and rudder deflection increased by 5° to cope with the higher thrust.

The A320neo is half as loud as an A320 at take-off, with an 85 decibel noise footprint. The LEAP-powered A321neo has 83.3 dB flyover noise, substantially lower than the older CFM56 and V2500.

Production

First delivery slipped to early 2016.
Lufthansa took delivery of the first A320neo on 20 January 2016.
Two hundred deliveries were targeted in 2017, but as Pratt & Whitney faced ramp-up difficulties, Airbus expected that 30 aircraft would have to be parked awaiting engines.
The fourth and latest final assembly line in Hamburg was to open in July 2017; 60 A320s should be produced monthly from 2019.

With 90 A320neos delivered by October 2017, Airbus acknowledged that it would not attain the 200 target, even with many deliveries in the fourth quarter. More than 40 A320neos were parked without engines, but with most of the engine issues resolved by early 2018, more than half of the A320s delivered in 2018 were expected to be neos.
Airbus expected to produce 60 narrow-bodies per month by the middle of 2019 and studied higher rates.
Airbus confirmed plans to reach 63 monthly from 55 in 2018 and study 70 to 75 monthly beyond 2019, though Safran, one of the two partners in LEAP producer CFM, could not commit to higher volumes.

In February 2018, after in-flight failures of the PW1100G with its high pressure compressor aft hub modified, apparently caused by problems with its knife edge seal, European Aviation Safety Agency (EASA) and Airbus grounded some A320neo family aircraft until they were fitted with spares.
, P&W engines had flown 500,000 hours since introduction and 113 P&W-powered A320neo family aircraft were operated by eight customers.
Airbus then stopped accepting PW1100G engines.

Deliveries of GTF-powered A320neos resumed in May after Pratt returned to the original design seal as a quick fix.
By the end of June, Airbus expected to have around 100 A320neos awaiting engines and aimed to deliver most of them in the second half of the year, for a total of over 800 aircraft handed over in 2018.
In the first five months of 2018, 69 had been delivered: 40% of all single-aisles, and almost 80% with CFM LEAP engines, but the 22 delivered in May were equally split between the two power plants.

After the three-month halt, the goal of 210 GTF-powered deliveries in 2018 was expected to be missed by 30–40 unless Pratt could accelerate production, exposing itself and Airbus to late penalties.
Airbus COO Guillaume Faury aimed to do away with "gliders", i.e. airframes without engines, by the end of 2018. Bernstein Research had forecast 50 fewer deliveries than planned and expected a return to normal by 2019.
Delivery targets could still be met with other engine options (neo or ceo), as 210 Leap-powered jets were planned.
After having peaked above 100, the number of aircraft parked awaiting their turbofans declined to 86 by the end of June.
The 500th A320neo family aircraft was delivered in October 2018.

In July 2019, with the A321neo accounting for 40% of sales, Airbus was examining options for allocating more production capacity to the stretched variant. It acknowledged that ramping up production of the popular Airbus Cabin Flex configuration was proving challenging. All A321s are currently assembled in Hamburg; one option under consideration would be to repurpose the A380 assembly line in Toulouse. In the first half of 2019, Airbus delivered  A320/A320neo-family aircraft, of which 71 were A321neos and 163 were A320neos (i.e. A321neos accounted for % of neo deliveries).

In January 2020, Airbus confirmed that the A380 assembly line is to be converted to a "digitally enabled" final assembly facility for the A321neo by mid-2022, because of unprecedented demand, in particular for the A321 LR and XLR variants. In February, it indicated that it had a clear path to increasing production rates beyond the 63 per month targeted for 2021, to reach 65 or 67 by 2023. In April, Airbus reduced the average production rate to 40 per month due to the impact of the COVID-19 pandemic on aviation from 2020.

In February 2021 Airbus set up a separate production line in Hamburg for A321XLR aft fuselage work, in a facility formerly used to assemble fuselage sections for the A380. The goal is to enable production of the XLR-specific aft fuselage to ramp up gradually without affecting other A320neo-family production output.

In May 2021, Airbus targeted a production rate of 45 per month by the end of 2021, 64 by the second quarter of 2023, asked its supply chain to allow a rate of 70 from the first quarter of 2024 and is looking for 75 by 2025.

Replacement wing

In 2015, Airbus started a new wing project, announced as the "Wing of the future" programme in 2017. A new 1–2 billion carbon-composite wing could be used in the A321neo-plus-plus, compared to $15 billion for a completely new design. The new wing is made from composite material. It is first seen as an upgrade to the existing, mostly metal A320 family wing, which was already upgraded many times. Airbus has already composite wings on the A350, but this will be an enhanced, new design with highly automated manufacturing suitable for inexpensive high-volume production. Announced in January 2016, a €44.8 million facility was built in Filton, with 300 engineers. The new wing design and tests take place in this Filton facility. Other Airbus locations in the UK, France, Spain and Germany are working with 30 partners on this wing project.

In May 2021, Airbus announced that for improved aerodynamic performance the wing will be longer and thinner with folding wingtips to access existing airport gates. By May 2021, assembly of the first demonstrator was to start in the coming weeks, as the project should be completed by 2023 before an eventual product launch.

A “radical” A320 makeover is expected to cost over 4 billion euros ($4.9 billion), significantly less than the estimates of $15 billion to $20 billion for an all-new Boeing design.
Due to the increased length and increased lift, the new wings could also be used on an Airbus A322, an A321 lengthened by 4 passenger seat-rows, being studied by Airbus.

The current A320neo family wingspan of 36m with an aspect-ratio of 9 will be extended by ground-folding wingtips to 45m with an aspect-ratio of 14. Additional semi-aeroelastic hinges could lead to 52m wingspan with an aspect-ratio of 18, still fitting in a standard 36m airport gate. In September 2021, Airbus announced starting the assembly of in total 3 full-size "Wing of Tomorrow" prototypes. The first prototype was completed in December 2021. The flapping wing section flight tests are targeted to begin in late 2023.

Replacement airliner
By November 2018, Airbus was hiring in Toulouse and Madrid to develop a clean sheet successor for the A320.
Although its launch was not guaranteed, it was expected to arrive from the middle of the following decade, after the A321XLR and a stretched A320neo "plus", and would have competed with the Boeing NMA that was, at the time, expected to be launched as early as 2019.
Service entry would be determined by ultra-high bypass ratio engine developments pursued by Pratt & Whitney, testing its Geared Turbofan upgrade; Safran, ground testing a demonstrator from 2021; and Rolls-Royce Plc, targeting a 2025 Ultrafan service entry.
The production target is a monthly rate of 100 narrow-bodies, up from 60.

At the November 2019 Dubai air show, Airbus chief executive Guillaume Faury said the company was considering the launch of a single-aisle programme in the second half of the 2020s for an introduction in the early 2030s.

Operational history

By January 2019, three years after its introduction, 585 neos were in commercial service with over 60 operators, led by IndiGo (87), Frontier Airlines (33) and China Southern (26).
Lufthansa confirms the PW 16% fuel savings, 21% per seat with denser 180-seat layout up from 168, while Avianca states its LEAPs are 15–20% more efficient, quieter, reduce oil consumption and routine maintenance.
Starting both GTFs initially took 6–7 min up from the A320ceo's 2 min, improving to 2–3 min by late 2017, still longer than the ceo.
LEAP production bottlenecks led to early delivery delays, with no significant repercussions at Avianca or AirAsia; AirAsia's dispatch reliability is comparable to its ceos.

On 30 November 2021, two years after receiving the 1,000th member of the A320neo family, IndiGo took delivery of the 2,000th, an A321neo (MSN 10654) at Airbus Hamburg site.

, the global A320neo fleet had completed more than 5.51 million flights over 11 million block hours since its entry into service and had been contributing to 15 million tons of  saving.

Engine and dispatch reliability
Engine vibration affects one GTF in 50, leading to premature replacement, but spare engine pools compete with new production: at Lufthansa, dispatch reliability has remained stagnant since service entry and is below its 99.8% goal, with a utilization rate 20% below its ceos.
P&W cites a 99.91% dispatch reliability for GTF-powered neos, higher than other new engine introductions, while Airbus reports a 99.6% dispatch reliability.
With engine deliveries resuming, there were expected to be fewer than 10 engine-less neos at the end of 2018;  Airbus is on track to reach its target rate of 60 deliveries per month by mid-2019.
Of the 6,362 orders, 2,456 are for CFM LEAP engines (%), 1,869 for Pratt & Whitney GTFs (%), and 2,037 for an as-yet unspecified engine choice (%).
By 30 June 2019, Safran claimed the Leap has a 61% market share on the A320neo family, with 44 airlines operating 454 Leap powered aircraft having accumulated 3.3 million flight hours.
In early 2022, 57% of in service A320neos were fitted with Leap engines, and 43% with PW1100G engines.

Flight control software update
In July 2019, Airbus disclosed two outwardly similar, though separate, issues which could result in excessive pitch up behaviour, one affecting the A320neo and the other the A321neo. Both issues were detected during analysis and laboratory testing, and have not been encountered in actual operation. Airbus has addressed the issues through temporary revisions to the flight manual, including loading recommendations and a change to the centre-of-gravity envelope, and expected to release updated flight control software in 2020.
As Lufthansa waited for the 2020 flight software update, it blocked the last row of its aft-heavy layout of 180, offering only 174 seats.

Military conversion
In 2018, Airbus explored the possibility of military versions, for VIP transport, intelligence, surveillance and reconnaissance and maritime patrol for the armed forces of France, Germany and the Netherlands; or Asia-Pacific nations such as Indonesia, Malaysia, New Zealand, and the Philippines. Such conversions would be possible within a six-to-eight-month timescale.

Variants

Airbus offers three variants of the A320neo family: the A319, A320 and A321. A neo variant for the Airbus A318 was not proposed but could be developed should demand arise.

A319neo 

Qatar Airways was set to be launch customer but upgraded its order to the larger A320neo in late 2013, with no new launch operator  named since then. Spirit later ordered 47 new A319neo aircraft.

The A319neo made its first flight on 31 March 2017, powered by CFM LEAP engines.
After 500 flight hours, the LEAP-powered A319neo achieved FAA/EASA Type Certification by 21 December 2018, allowing it to enter service in the first half of 2019.
At the time 53 aircraft had been ordered, including 17 with Leap engines: 12 for Avianca, four for an unconfirmed Chinese operator (later known as China Southern Airlines, which became the launch operator), and one ACJ319neo; and 36 with no engine selection: eight for Avianca, 26 for unannounced customers, and two ACJ319neos.
, certification of the PW1100G-powered version was planned for the end of 2019, with the same test aircraft to be converted during the first quarter and undergo 200 hours of flight testing.
In 2018, an A319neo list price was US$101.5 million.

Interest in the variant has been low, and in January 2019 the A319neo's order backlog was only a fraction of that of the A220, following confirmation of orders from JetBlue and Moxy for 60 A220s each. Also in January 2019, Airbus confirmed that, while it expects fewer orders due to competition with the A220-300, it has no plans to discontinue the A319neo.

The Pratt & Whitney-powered variant made its maiden flight on 25 April 2019.
It gained EASA type certification by the end of November 2019, after 90 sorties over 240 h.

As of May 2021, six ACJ319neo aircraft had been ordered.
On 18 February 2022, China Southern Airlines received the first of its order of four A319neo with CFM LEAP engines.

A320neo 

 Timeline 
The first A320neo rolled out of the Airbus factory in Toulouse on 1 July 2014. It first flew on 25 September 2014. A joint type certification from EASA and the FAA was received on 24 November 2015.
Nearly 28 years after the first A320, on 25 January 2016, the A320neo entered service with Lufthansa, the type's launch customer.

 Reliability 
Six months later at Farnborough Airshow, John Leahy reported that the eight in-service aircraft had achieved 99.7% dispatch reliability.
By the end of February 2017, 28,105 scheduled flights had been performed by 71 A320neo aircraft with 134 cancellations for a 99.5% completion rate.
Spirit Airlines reported PW1000G engine issues on four of its A320neos and did not fly them above  because the bleed air system froze shut on occasion due to cold temperatures; the same problem was reported by IndiGo.

 Efficiency 
After a year in service, Lufthansa confirmed the 20% efficiency gain per passenger with up to 180 seats, along with reduced noise and  emissions.
Operators confirm the 15% per seat fuel-burn savings even counterbalanced by the added weight on short sectors, which can rise to 16–17% on longer routes and to 20% or more for Lufthansa with 180 passengers up from 168 with two more seat rows.

 Deliveries 
Airbus planned to deliver about 200 A320neos in 2017.
In 2018, new A320neos have a $49 million value, rising by 1–2% per year, and are leased for $330,000-350,000 per month (-%) due to intense lessor competition and low financing costs, while a recent A320ceo is leased for $300,000.
In 2018, an A320neo list price was US$110.6 million.

 Military A320M3A 
In July 2018, Airbus was evaluating an A320neo variant for ISR missions, particularly maritime patrol and anti-submarine warfare, and military transport. The aircraft will be able to take roll-on/roll-off mission payloads to carry passengers, troops, VIPs, patients, or cargo. The aircraft could be fitted with a weapons bay, a self-protection system, or a magnetic anomaly detector and could be configured for signals intelligence or Airborne Early Warning and Control.

A321neo 

This lengthened fuselage variant has structural strengthening in the landing gear and wing, increased wing loading and other minor modifications due to higher Maximum Takeoff Weight (MTOW).

Its first customer was ILFC.
The Airbus A321neo prototype, D-AVXB, first flew on 9 February 2016.
It suffered a tailstrike three days later and was flown to Toulouse for repairs, delaying the certification programme for several weeks.

It received its type certification with Pratt & Whitney engines on 15 December 2016, and simultaneous EASA and FAA certification for the CFM Leap powered variant on 1 March 2017.
The first A321neo, leased by GECAS, was delivered in Hamburg to Virgin America, configured with 184 seats and LEAP engines, and entered service in May 2017.

The neo empty weight is 1.8t more than the ceo due to new engines and associated airframe modifications: engine pylons, wing structure and bleed and oil systems were adapted.
At the same maximum weight, it reaches FL310 30-nm before and 4 min earlier than the CEO.

To offer similar takeoff performance, pitch response to stick input is a rate-command to hit the 3°/sec rotation rate to capture the right pitch attitude and there is an "electronic tail bumper" preventing a tailstrike if the stick is less than three-quarters of the way aft; additional thrust, slower rotation and lift-off speeds require more rudder authority and its maximum deflection went from 25° to 30°.

By January 2018, the A321neo had received 1,920 orders, exceeding orders for the A321ceo. By this time the A321neo accounted for 32% of all A320neo family orders, whereas the original A321 represented just 22% of A320ceo family orders. By July 2022, the A321neo represented over 53% of all A320neo family orders.
A stretch would probably involve fore and aft plugs to keep its centre-of-gravity, but tailstrike clearance could constrain field speed and performance and a larger aircraft could need more powerful engines, while further cabin crew would be needed over 250 seats.
In 2018, an A321neo list price was US$129.5 million.

Delivery delays 

As Pratt & Whitney encountered early reliability issues with the PW1100G, retrofitting fixes affected the deliveries.
Cebu Pacific was due to add its first three A321neos to its 40 A320ceos by the end of 2017 but agreed to postpone them; it was to receive seven A321ceos in 2018, starting in March, to upgauge A320 routes from slot-constrained Manila Airport and redeploy some of its international A330s to shorter-haul routes.
Air New Zealand has at least seven A321neos in its 13 A320-family orders, increasing seating capacity by 27% over A320ceos currently used on short-haul international routes, mainly to Australia; the neos will be delayed until July 2018 for the A320neos and September 2018 for the A321neos with a new, higher density and some A320ceo leases will be extended for the interim.

Hawaiian's first two A321neos were to have been delivered in 2017 before its upcoming winter peak season but were postponed to early 2018, a "frustrating" and "irritating" delay, with another nine in 2018, mostly in the first half. They are intended to open up thinner routes to the U.S. mainland not viable with its widebodies, such as Portland to Maui, or better matched and allowing two routes to be expanded to daily service instead of seasonal, bypassing its Honolulu hub for half of the A321neo fleet.

Well suited for  routes to the US west coast, Hawaiian's 189-seat A321neos are more efficient than the competing narrow-body aircraft and even have slightly lower per-seat costs than its 294-seat A330-200s.

Cabin Flex 

By permanently replacing the second door pair in front of the wing (R2/L2) with a new second pair of overwing exits, the capacity of the A321neo is increased from 220 seats to 240 seats and fuel efficiency per seat is increased by 6%, exceeding 20% together with the new engines and the sharklets.
The modifications should weigh 100 kg more.
Initial A321neos have the A321ceo exit door configuration with four exit door pairs until the Airbus Cabin-Flex (ACF) layout can be selected.

The third door pair (R3/L3), aft of the wings, is moved aft four frames back and could be plugged for 195 seats or less, and one overwing exit can be plugged for 165 seats or less.
In October 2017, the first A321neo ACF was in final assembly in Hamburg.
It was rolled out on 5 January 2018, and will be ground tested before first flight in the following weeks.
It was to be delivered in mid-2018 and the optional layout will become the A321neo default from 2020.
It made its first flight on 31 January 2018.

The ACF exit limit is 250 passengers, but the aircraft is available for up to 240 passengers; it could be offered for 244 or potentially beyond by integrating flight attendant seats in the lavatories outside wall to allow additional passenger seats.
The EASA allows 244 passengers with "overperforming" Type C exits at both ends, two Type III overwing exits, a Type C mid-cabin exit and a separate approval for individual customised cabin layouts.
The FAA would limit it to 200 as the mid-cabin exit would be derated to a Type III exit: 65 each for Type C doors at the ends plus 70 for all the Type III exits; Airbus seeks an exemption to increase it to 105 for 235 passengers for the aircraft. Four different door-arrangement configurations are noted below.

A321LR 

In October 2014, Airbus started marketing a 164-seat,  MTOW variant with three auxiliary fuel tanks called the A321neoLR (Long Range) with  more operational range than a Boeing 757-200 configured with 169 seats, 27% lower trip costs and 24% lower per seat costs; it was scheduled for introduction in the second half of 2018, two years after the A321neo.

Airbus launched the A321LR on 13 January 2015 with Air Lease Corporation as the launch customer, hoping to sell 1,000 examples of the variant. The initial layout of 164 seats (20 in business, 30 in premium economy and 114 in economy) was replaced by a two-class 206-seat configuration (16 in business and 190 in economy). The A321LR is replacing the 757 in the middle of the market. The A321LR will have the Cabin Flex layout and was to be first delivered in Q4 2018.

Certification is aimed for the second quarter of 2018, with a programme including tests with one, two, three, or no additional centre tanks and a transatlantic flight on 13 February.
Test flights included a Leap-powered, long range  flight by great circle distance, flown in near 11 h and the equivalent of 162 passengers over  including headwinds, with five crew and 11 technicians.

Airbus announced its joint FAA/EASA certification on 2 October 2018, including ETOPS up to 180 min allowing any transatlantic route.
As original launch operator Primera Air ceased operations, the first will be delivered to Israeli carrier Arkia, while 120 orders have been secured from about 12 operators: Norwegian, TAP Air Portugal, Air Transat, Aer Lingus, Air Astana, Air Arabia and Azores Airlines will receive theirs from 2019, and Jetstar and Peach in 2020.
On 13 November 2018, Arkia received the first A321LR, featuring 220 seats in a single-class and to be deployed to London, Paris, Barcelona for up to 5h sectors, or to Zanzibar and the Seychelles, saying it is the first narrow-body more efficient than the 757-300 it operates.

In April 2019, JetBlue announced its intention to use the A321LR on routes to London from Boston and New York City; the airline has converted 13 of its orders for the A321neo to the A321LR to serve these routes. The airline started its service from New York-JFK to London Heathrow on 11 August 2021, and to London Gatwick on 29 September.

A321XLR

In January 2018, Airbus stated that it was studying an A321LR variant with a further increased MTOW needing a strengthened landing gear. With a lower-density cabin it was expected to fly almost .
It would cover more of the market segment likely to be targeted by the Boeing NMA. The proposed A321XLR with a range extended to  would be launched in 2019 to enter service in 2021 or 2022. Integrated in the fuselage to save weight, the centre fuel tank would be enlarged. , about 200–300 nmi of the targeted range increase had already been secured; additional work would be needed to achieve the remaining 200 nmi.

In October 2018, the A321XLR was proposed to Air Transat and AerCap: Air Transat could reach Southern European destinations such as Split, Croatia from Montreal and Toronto. In January 2019, Air Canada expressed interest in using narrow-body aircraft for transatlantic routes and was considering options including the A321XLR and the Boeing 737 MAX.

Commercial launch
The A321XLR was officially launched at the Paris Air Show on 17 June 2019, with deliveries expected from 2024. Its design offers  of range and features a new permanent Rear Centre Tank (RCT) for more fuel, a strengthened landing gear for a  MTOW, and an optimised wing trailing-edge flap to preserve take-off performance. The RCT will hold  of fuel, the equivalent of four  current ACTs, while it weighs like one and takes up the space of two; a forward ACT can also be fitted if necessary.
As the sharklets lowered take-off and landing speeds, the switch from a double-slotted to single-slotted inboard flap will reduce complexity, weight and drag, and the FMS can set intermediate flap positions; the revised design could be applied to other A321neo variants.

Orders from several lessors and airlines were announced at the show, starting with Middle East Airlines, which ordered four A321XLRs, making it the launch airline customer. Air Lease Corporation ordered twenty-seven A321XLRs alongside twenty-three other A321neos and fifty A220-300s. IAG quoted a $142 million list price as it committed to 28 aircraft, including eight for Iberia, six for Aer Lingus, plus 14 options. Qantas Group placed an order for 36 XLRs, to be operated on routes between Australia and Asia, and is also set to be one of the launch customers. American Airlines converted 30 A321neo orders to XLRs and ordered an additional 20 XLRs. Indigo Partners also placed an order for 50 XLRs for its airline divisions and Frontier Airlines ordered 18, bringing the total number of commitments announced at the show to 243.

Some are cautious about the potential market: Lufthansa sees the variant as a "niche aircraft" less comfortable than widebodies, and a large lessor is hesitant as it expects a 400–500 aircraft market.
Airbus argues that the minimal changes mean it can be used as a regular A321neo and ALC forecast potential for 50 operators in the next five years.
The market could prefer shorter turnaround times to more range.

On 29 October 2019, IndiGo placed a firm order for 300 A320neo Family aircraft comprising a mix of A320neo, A321neoLR and A321XLR aircraft, taking IndiGo's total number of A320neo family aircraft orders to 730. Airbus monthly reports lists the 300 order as 87 A320neo and 213 A321neoLR/A321XLR.
On 3 December 2019, United Airlines announced an order to purchase 50 new Airbus A321XLR aircraft, with deliveries beginning in 2024, to replace their Boeing 757-200 fleet. Valued at $7.1 billion before discounts ($M each), United plans to use these aircraft for additional destinations in Europe from its East Coast hubs in Washington and Newark, New Jersey.
In April 2020, 450 orders for the XLR had been received from 24 customers.

Manufacturing
The XLR needs 10–15% more work than an ACF, itself requiring 30% more work than a standard A321neo.
Engines used for now generate  of thrust and could be sufficient, and no more than the  already certified are needed for the XLR.
The XLR is a low-risk, high-commonality variant but more substantial upgrades could include a composite wing or a stretch.

By April 2020, Airbus had cut the first metal for the centre wingbox, while Safran had begun undercarriage forgings production.
Premium Aerotec will manufacture the specific aft centre fuel tank primary structure, Spirit AeroSystems will build the inboard single-slotted flap, FACC AG will produce a modified belly fairing, while Collins Aerospace and Parker Aerospace are developing the fuel systems.
By August 2020, Premium Aerotec had started producing the rear centre tank for the first A321XLR in Augsburg, to be transferred to Airbus's Hamburg plant in early 2021.

By April 2021, a standard A321LR fuselage section had been withdrawn from the Hamburg production line for use as a "pre-industrial system accelerator" to test the integration of XLR-specific systems; at Saint-Nazaire, a nose section was serving as an integration test bed for a new instrument panel assembly, before being used to analyse structural reinforcements needed for the XLR.
By then, Airbus had completed the first centre wing box 16 months after the first metal cuts, with 200 modifications from the standard design, delivered from Nantes to Hamburg for structural assembly.
The fuselage sections, wings, landing gear and tailplanes of the first test aircraft were delivered to the Hamburg Final Assembly Line in November, and its structure was completed by early December, among three planned development aircraft, and before entry into service in 2023.

The first A321XLR prototype was rolled out in May 2022, equipped with CFM LEAP engines.
The first flight took place on 15 June 2022 from Hamburg.

However, entry into service was pushed back to 2024 from the original 2023 to address fuel tank issues raised by regulators. A revised design with special conditions was approved by the United States Federal Aviation Administration in December 2022.

Airbus Corporate Jets

The CFM LEAP or Pratt & Whitney PW1100G lower fuel-burn provides additional range along with lower engine noise while the cabin altitude does not exceed .
To increase its fuel capacity, the ACJ319neo is offered with up to five additional centre tanks (ACT).

The first ACJ320neo was delivered in January 2019, with deliveries of the ACJ319neo expected to start a few months later.
On 25 April 2019, the ACJ319neo, outfitted with five ACTs, completed its first flight, before a short test campaign and subsequent delivery to German K5 Aviation. The following day, the aircraft completed an endurance test flight lasting 16 hours and 10 minutes and setting a record for the longest A320-family flight by an Airbus crew.

Operators

, 2,608 A320neo family aircraft were in service with 127 operators, 85 of which use CFM engines, and 42 PW engines. The five largest operators were IndiGo operating 242, China Southern Airlines 98, China Eastern Airlines 89, Frontier Airlines 88 and Wizz Air 84 aircraft.

Orders and deliveries

At the A320neo programme launch on 1 December 2010, Airbus anticipated "a market potential of 4,000 A320neo Family aircraft over the next 15 years". The six month head-start of the A320neo allowed Airbus to rack up 1,000 orders before Boeing announced the MAX. In less than a year, by the November 2011 Dubai Airshow, the family had reached 1,420 orders and commitments, making it the "fastest selling aircraft ever". By March 2013, a little over two years after launch, It had received 2,000 orders. At the first jet delivery in January 2016, the family had received almost 4,500 orders from nearly 80 customers.
 it had 5,052 orders : 49 A319neos (%), 3,617 A320neos (%) and 1,386 A321neos (%), with 1,712 of them powered by CFM LEAPs (%), 1,429 by PW GTFs (%) and 1,911 undisclosed (%).
By December 2021, as many orders migrated to the larger A321neo, it became the most popular variant with 3,958 orders compared to 3,748 orders for the A320neo, while the previous A321 achieved a third of the A320 family orders.

, a total of 8,754 A320neo family aircraft had been ordered by 130 customers, of which 2,647 aircraft had been delivered.

 2011
In early January 2011, IndiGo reached a memorandum of understanding (MoU) for 150 A320neos along 30 A320ceos.
On 17 January, Virgin America became the launch customer, ordering 60 A320s including 30 A320neos.

At the June 2011 Paris Air Show, it gathered 667 commitments worth US$60.9 billion, raising the backlog to 1,029.
Malaysian low-cost carrier AirAsia ordered 200, the largest commercial aviation order at the time.
IndiGo confirmed its 150 order.
Airbus received orders from GECAS, Scandinavian Airlines, TransAsia Airways, IndiGo, LAN Airlines, AirAsia, GoAir, Air Lease Corporation and Avianca.

On 20 July 2011, American Airlines announced an order for 460 narrowbody jets including 130 A320ceos and 130 A320neos, and intended to order 100 re-engined 737 with CFM LEAPs, pending Boeing confirmation.
The order broke Boeing's monopoly with the airline and forced Boeing into the re-engined 737 MAX.
As this sale included a Most-Favoured-Customer Clause, the European airframer must refund any price difference to American if it sells to another airline at a lower price. As a result, Airbus was unable to offer the A320neo at a price which United Airlines deemed "competitive", leaving it with a Boeing-skewed fleet.

On 27 July 2011, Lufthansa ordered 25 A320neos and 5 A321neos. The November Dubai Airshow saw a further 130 orders, raising the total to 1,420 orders and commitments, making it the fastest selling aircraft ever.

 2012
On 25 January, Norwegian and Airbus confirmed an order of 100 A320neos.
In November, Virgin America deferred the deliveries of the A320neo aircraft until 2020, making ILFC the new launch customer along with the A321neo. In December 2012 Pegasus Airlines, the second largest airline in Turkey, signed a deal for up to 100 A320neo family aircraft, of which 75 (57 A320neo and 18 A321neo models) are firm orders.

 2013
Lufthansa ordered an additional 70 A320neo and A321neo aircraft on 14 March 2013. easyJet, who already operates 195 A320ceo family aircraft, intends to acquire 100 Airbus A320neo for delivery between 2017 and 2022. As part of the deal, easyJet have options on a further 100 A320neo aircraft, and the Japanese carrier ANA is to order the A320neo and A321neo.  Lion Air ordered 183.
On 15 March 2013, Turkish Airlines ordered 82 A320s with 35 options including four A320neo and 53 A321neo.

 2014
On 15 October 2014 IndiGo signed a MoU with Airbus for purchasing 250 A320neo family aircraft. The deal would be worth over $25.5 billion as per the list price per aircraft. This order will also be the largest by the airline, marking the largest number of jets ever sold by the European planemaker in a single order. The airline had earlier ordered 100 aircraft in 2005 and another 180 aircraft in 2011.

 2017
On 15 November 2017 Airbus announced the signing of a MoU with Indigo Partners' four portfolio airlines for 430 A320neo family aircraft – a deal worth nearly $50 billion. On 14 December 2017 Delta Air Lines announced an order for 100 A321neo aircraft and 100 options, powered by Pratt & Whitney PW1100Gs.

 2018
By September 2018, Airbus should deliver 3,174 A320neos compared with 2,999 Boeing 737 MAX through 2022.
A320neo-family maintenance should rise from $650 million in 2018 to $3.3 billion in 2022.

 2019
On 29 October 2019, IndiGo placed a firm order for 300 A320neo Family aircraft, marking one of Airbus' largest aircraft orders ever with a single airline operator. The order comprised a mix of A320neo, A321neo and A321XLR aircraft. This takes IndiGo's total number of A320neo Family aircraft orders to 730.

On 18 November 2019, the low cost carrier Air Arabia ordered 120 A320neo family jets worth $14 billion at list prices: 70 A320neos and 50 A321neos/XLRs, to be delivered from 2024.

Accidents and incidents 

The A320neo family has had four ground fatalities and one hull loss accident .

Accidents (airport-safety related) 
In September 2022, a TAP Air Portugal Airbus A320neo operating flight TP1492 from Lisbon to Conakry International Airport hit a motorbike during landing. Both occupants of the motorbike were killed and the aircraft received damage to its right engine. One rider of the motorbike was identified as the airport's security guard.

On 18 November 2022, a LATAM Perú Airbus A320neo taking off from Jorge Chávez International Airport as Flight 2213 to Juliaca collided with a fire engine that was crossing the runway during a training exercise, killing two firefighters and injuring a third. All 102 passengers and 6 crew aboard escaped unharmed. The aircraft was reportedly written off.

Specifications

Notes

Engines

See also

References

External links 

 
 

A320neo
Twinjets
Airbus A320 family
2010s international airliners
Aircraft first flown in 2014